Deception Obsession is a 2015 Chinese suspense horror thriller film directed by Xiang Haiming and Ji Qiao. It was released on November 27, 2015.

Plot

Cast
Sun Feifei
Tai Li
Shang Rong
Wang Yijia
Qiuguo Chen

Reception
The film has earned  at the Chinese box office.

References

2015 horror thriller films
2015 horror films
Chinese horror thriller films